Celso Mancini (1542–1612) was a Roman Catholic prelate who served as Bishop of Alessano (1597–1612).

Biography
Celso Mancini was born in 1542. On 14 April 1597, he was appointed during the papacy of Pope Clement VIII as Bishop of Alessano. He served as Bishop of Alessano until his death in 1612.

References

External links and additional sources
 (for Chronology of Bishops) 
 (for Chronology of Bishops) 

16th-century Italian Roman Catholic bishops
17th-century Italian Roman Catholic bishops
1542 births
1612 deaths
Bishops appointed by Pope Clement VIII